Specklinia tribuloides is a species of orchid plant native to Central America.

References 

tribuloides
Orchids of Central America
Orchids of Belize
Flora of Belize
Flora of Costa Rica
Flora of Cuba
Flora of the Dominican Republic
Flora of Guatemala
Flora of Haiti
Flora of Honduras
Flora of Jamaica
Flora of Mexico
Flora of Nicaragua
Flora of Panama
Flora of Suriname
Flora without expected TNC conservation status